Francisca Valenzuela (born March 17, 1987, in San Francisco, California) is an American-born Chilean singer, poet, and multi-instrumentalist. Valenzuela was born and raised in San Francisco, California, where she resided until the age of 12, before moving to Santiago, Chile. She gained popularity in Chile and Latin America following the release of her debut album, Muérdete La Lengua, in June 2007. Her second album, Buen Soldado, followed in March 2011. Valenzuela has earned both gold and platinum album certification in Chile.

Early life
Francisca Valenzuela was born in San Francisco, California to Chilean-born scientists, Pablo Valenzuela Valdés and Bernardita Méndez Velasco. She is the fourth oldest and only daughter of five children. Valenzuela attended Park Day School in nearby Oakland, California. At a very early age, Valenzuela demonstrated an interest in music and began taking music lessons at the age of 7. By age ten, she was playing acoustic guitar and continued studying classical piano. During summer vacations and Christmases, she and her brothers would travel to Santiago, where they would visit relatives. Eventually, the family would make the permanent move to Santiago, when she was 12. Valenzuela attended Saint George's College, an elite private school in the Vitacura neighborhood of Santiago.

After submitting poetry of her own composition to various literary magazines and taking summer poetry courses, Valenzuela's parents helped her submit more material to a friend, who was also a literary critic at Stanford University. Many of her poems were published in the Latin American literary magazine, El Andar. In 2000, she published her first book,Defenseless Waters, featuring a collection of her poems and illustrations. The book featured a foreword by famed Chilean author Isabel Allende. She released her second book, Abejorros/Madurar, which was distributed in Spain and Latin America in 2001. As part a promotional tour for Defenseless Waters, she brought her guitar and keyboard to venues in northern California, where she gave poetry readings and performed songs of her own composition.  Valenzuela is fluent in English and Spanish and often composes in both languages.

Music career

2004–2007: Beginnings and Muérdete la Lengua

Shortly after the release of her first book, Francisca and her family moved to Santiago, Chile when she was 13. While residing in Chile, Francisca took part as singer in school festivals, where she performed her original songs. In 2004, she attended an intensive jazz program at the Berklee College School of Music in Boston. She first began looking for a record deal by sending her demos to major record label offices throughout Chile with no success. She performed English-language songs at bars and clubs in Santiago, but eventually began writing and performing in Spanish. After many unsuccessful attempts at signing with a major label, Valenzuela decided to release her music independently in Chile.

In 2006, Valenzuela unofficially released her first solo single, "Peces", which she wrote at age 13 about a boy she liked who did not reciprocate her feelings. Within a few months after its release, "Peces" gained popularity on Chilean radio. "Peces" was recognized by Rolling Stone magazine in Chile, as one of the best 100 songs of the year 2006. Due to the success of her first unofficial single, Valenzuela began recording her debut album in Santiago. Brothers Mauricio and Francisco Durán of Los Bunkers produced the album. In December 2006, she released her second single, "Dulce", which reached number two on Chile's national charts.

To add more achievements to her short musical career, on May 19, 2007, she was invited by Julieta Venegas to open her concert at Teatro Caupolicán.  On June 30, 2007, her debut album, Muérdete La Lengua was released in Chile.  The Chilean press quickly dubbed her as The Princess of Rock, calling her,"[a] new musical revelation". Soon after its release, the album was certified as Gold in Chile. Valenzuela performed in New York City at the annual LAMC conference in July 2008. This was Valenzuela's first musical exposure in the US and gave her an opportunity to showcase her music outside of Latin America. To promote her debut album, Valenzuela performed at various venues across Chile, as well as Mexico, Argentina, and other countries throughout Latin America.

2009–2012: Buen Soldado
In early 2009, Valenzuela began the pre-production stages for her second album in Santiago and Berlin.  She contributed to the Chilean water conservation documentary H2O:Cero, by composing a new song called "En Blanco" for the film. She has also participated in the album tribute for Violeta Parra, recording a new version of "Run Run Se Fue Pa'l Norte" as well as recording a version of Inti-Illimani's song "Vuelvo".

In 2009, she collaborated with Chilean rapper, Latin Bitman for his album Colour; Valenzuela co-wrote and sang two songs, "Help Me" and "Someday". "Help Me" was later released as a single in the United States and Chile and a music video was also filmed in Los Angeles in November 2009. In August 2010, Valenzuela began recording for her second studio album in Santiago. Production on the album was completed in late 2010. On January 1, 2011, Valenzuela released in digital formats her first single "Quiero Verte Más" from her second studio album called Buen Soldado; the album was released on March 3, 2011, in Chile as a physical and digital release. In addition to embarking on a national tour in Chile, Valenzuela also promoted Buen Soldado internationally at the South by Southwest music festival in Austin, Texas in March 2012. She also performed at Midem in Cannes, France, representing Chile. Valenzuela had previously performed at the festival in 2011.

Valenzuela is a featured artist on Spanish singer-songwriter, Alejandro Sanz's tribute album, Y Si Fueran Ellas. She recorded a cover of Sanz's Lola Soledad for the album. The album features contributions from thirteen female vocalists, including Thalía and Ana Torroja. The album was released worldwide on iTunes on November 19, 2013.

2014: Tajo Abierto
In May 2014, Valenzuela confirmed that her third studio album, Tajo Abierto, would be released in September 2014. The album's first official single, "Prenderemos fuego al cielo", was available for digital download on iTunes on July 15, 2014. Valenzuela wrote most of the album on the piano before learning how to use special computer software to create the final studio version. She began recording her third studio album began recording the album in November 2013 and completed production in May 2014. The majority of the album was recorded in Los Angeles, California, with the exception of one song, "Cuequita del corazón", which Valenzuela recorded in Santiago, Chile at Estudios del Sur. Valenzuela worked on the album with four producers: Jesse Rogg, Vicente Sanfuentes (who co-produced her second album), Dave Sitek, and Áureo Baqueiro. Valenzuela wrote 25 songs for the album and chose 11 for the final track listing.

In 2014, Valenzuela formed her own independent record label, Frantastic Records, with the help of her mother, Vicente Sanfuentes, and a small team in Chile. Tajo Abierto was released worldwide on iTunes on September 9, 2014. To promote the album, she performed in Spain, Mexico, and Chile in September and November 2014. She returned to the US, where she debuted at Lollapalooza in Chicago on August 1, 2014. While in the US, she performed in Los Angeles and Oakland, California. "Armadura" was announced as the album's second single and was released for digital download on December 11, 2014. Tajo Abierto was named one of the best albums of 2014 by iTunes Chile.

In 2014, Valenzuela traveled to the Brazilian cities of Manaus and Rio de Janeiro, as well as the Amazonian Jungle, to write and record a music video for the HBO Latin America tourism documentary, "Encuentros en Brasil". She wrote the song, "Reina tropical de Brasil" ("Tropical Queen of Brazil" in English). The documentary series aired in Latin America and the Caribbean in September 2014. An EP of songs from the documentary was later released on iTunes on July 14, 2014.

In late December 2014, Valenzuela was selected along with 23 other well-known international artists to record the official theme song, "Live It", for at the 24th annual World Men's Handball Championship. A music video for the song was filmed and later premiered on YouTube on December 18, 2014. Valenzuela represents Chile. She and the other artists performed at the opening ceremony in Doha, Qatar on January 15, 2015.

2018–present: La Fortaleza 
In 2018, she released the first two singles of her upcoming fourth studio album, "Tómame" and "Ya no se trata de ti", both tracks charted on the Chile Singles Chart, peaking on the positions 15 and 39, respectively. In July 2019, she released "Héroe", the third single of the album, which reach the top 10 on the Chile Singles Chart, making her fifth top 10 on the country. She performed the song at the closing ceremony of the 2019 Pan American Games in Lima, Peru during the handover segment for the next Games in her hometown Santiago.

On January 17, 2020, Valenzuela released her fourth studio album, La Fortaleza. A week before she released the fourth single of the album, "Flotando" which peaked at the number 70 on the Chile Singles Chart.

Fashion career
Valenzuela began modeling for the popular Chilean clothing brand, "Foster" in 2012. In May 2013, she partnered with the company to design a collection. Her collection features black and white pieces inspired by 60s mod and SKA. The collection is available exclusively in Foster stores throughout Chile. On November 6, 2013, Valenzuela revealed that she had designed a second collection for Foster. The Summer 2014 collection features 21 pieces, including accessories like handbags and wallets, designed by Valenzuela.

Personal life
Valenzuela took a summer course in International Relations at University of California, Berkeley. Later, she studied journalism at Universidad Católica in Santiago, Chile. In 2010, due to a busy touring and pre-production schedule for her second album, she put her studies on hold and later dropped out to pursue music full-time. As of January 2016, she is in a relationship with Chilean producer, Vicente Sanfuentes. She resides in Los Angeles, California.

Discography

Studio albums

Singles

As featured artist

Other songs

Music videos
"Dulce" (2006)
"Muérdete La Lengua"(2007)
"Afortunada"(2008)
"Muleta"(2008)
"Peces"(2009)
""El Tiempo en Las Bastillas"(2009)
"Help Me (Latin Bitman feat. Francisca Valenzuela) (2009)
"Estrechez de Corazón (as a featured artist) (2011)
"Quiero Verte Más" (2011)
 "Que Sería" (2011)
 "En Mi Memoria" (2011)
 "Esta Soy Yo" (2011)
"Mucho Corazón" (Sussie 4 feat. Francisca Valenzuela) (2012)
 "Buen Soldado (2012)
"Reina tropical de Brasil" (2014)
""Prenderemos fuego al cielo" (2014)
"Live It" (as a featured artist) (2014)
"Armadura" (2015)
"Insulto" (2015)
"Almost Superstars" (2015)
"Catedral" (2016)
"Estremecer" (2016)
"Tómame" (2018)
"Ya No Se Trata De Ti" (2018)
"Héroe" (2019)
"Flotando" (2020)

References

External links
Official music website
Official MySpace
Official Blog

1987 births
Living people
21st-century Chilean women singers
Chilean pianists
Chilean pop singers
Chilean guitarists
Chilean women poets
Chilean singer-songwriters
Rock en Español musicians
20th-century Chilean poets
21st-century Chilean poets
American emigrants to Chile
Naturalized citizens of Chile
Feminist musicians
Women in Latin music
21st-century women pianists
21st-century American women singers
21st-century American singers
American pianists
American guitarists
American pop singers
American women poets
American singer-songwriters